The Illusion is the 33rd book in the Animorphs series, written by K.A. Applegate. It is known to have been ghostwritten by Ellen Geroux. It is narrated by Tobias.

Plot summary

The Yeerks have finished their anti-morphing ray and want to test it. Tobias comes up with a plan to trick the Yeerks into thinking that it doesn't work; if they capture him, they will try to use it on his hawk form, but hawk is his true form now. Tobias acquires Ax—thus allowing him to 'demorph' and reinforce the impression that he is a genuine Andalite—and then gets captured by the Yeerks. Rachel was supposed to be with him in fly morph to be able to rescue him and tell the rest where the lab was. However, sub-visser Taylor gave them an anesthetic so she couldn't grip to Tobias and fell to the floor. Tobias, alone and trapped, tries to get demorphed unsuccessfully since he is already demorphed. He is then tortured by the sadistic Taylor with a machine that controls the parts of the brain that induce pain and pleasure. He almost goes insane and nearly dies after receiving heightened, alternating doses of painful and pleasant sensations and memories. He sees painful memories of childhood neglect or battle, after seeing pleasant peaceful memories. This process nearly kills him. Here, he experienced an Utzum, later explained by Ax to be a vision ancient Andalites believed happened at the moment of death to comfort those crossing over. These images are supposed to be passed through DNA. Tobias is spoken to by his father Elfangor who shares with him his own memories of hardship, battle, his moments of questioning himself and his own actions. He reminds Tobias that he is part of a great tradition of warriors in order to comfort him before his death. Tobias is rescued by Ax and the other Animorphs. In the battle he persuades Rachel not to kill Taylor, so as not sink to her level. After the battle Tobias continues to question who and what he is. However he takes comfort in his relationship with Rachel and she kisses him for the first time.

Morphs

Animorphs books
1999 American novels
1999 science fiction novels
Books about birds
Works about torture